Toronto Transportation Services is the division of the City of Toronto which manages transport infrastructure within public rights of way in Toronto. With an operating budget of approximately $436.4 million in 2022 and 1,400 staff, the division maintains the city's surface streets and sidewalks, cycling infrastructure, the Gardiner Expressway and the Don Valley Parkway.

History
The department was created in the 1998 amalgamation of Toronto from the merger of:
 Metropolitan Toronto Transportation Department (Metro Toronto Roads and Transportation)
 North York Transportation Department
 Scarborough Works Department
 Etobicoke Transportation Department
 City of York Transportation Department
 East York Transportation Department
 City of Toronto Department of Public Works and the Environment

Before amalgamation, Metro Toronto Transportation was responsible for major roads across Metro, while the municipalities were responsible for collector and local roads in their respective areas.

Responsibilities and operations

Transportation Services is responsible for planning, construction, and management of the transportation infrastructure within the public right-of-way, including the public realm, sidewalks and roads. This includes: 

 maintenance of around 10,000 different streets totalling 5,397 kilometres  
 over 2,400 traffic signals
 7,100 km of sidewalks
 530 bridges
 over one million signs
 4,100 bus shelters

Snow removal
The division is responsible for snow removal on public roads, sidewalks and other public areas:
 Total kilometres of ploughed sidewalks: 6,000
 Total number of opened driveways: 262,000

A variety of city and contract staff/equipment are used for snow removal:
 592 snowplows/graders
 5 Metromelt melting machines 
 PD-350 snow melting trailer units
 296 sidewalk ploughs
 211 salt trucks
 City staff: 536
 Contracted staff: 1,068

Average snowfall in the city is 130 cm per year with 40 to 50 days of de-icing events per year.

An average of 146,275 tonnes of salt is used each year (based on a ten-year average). The city's snow removal budget is over $60 million a year.

Transportation Services is also responsible for a wide variety of activities including:
 Road and sidewalk maintenance
 Street cleaning
 Permits for on-street parking, construction and street events
 Traffic signs and pavement markings
 Traffic signals and traffic safety
 Red light camera operations
 Construction planning and policies

Traffic Management Centre
The Traffic Management Centre consists of the Traffic Safety, Traffic Plant Installations and Maintenance, and Urban Traffic Control Systems units. These units are responsible for:
 Red light cameras
 Central traffic signal systems
 Priority for Toronto Transit Commission and emergency vehicles (Toronto Fire Services, Toronto Paramedic Services, Toronto Police Service)
 Traffic Safety Unit providing traffic data and collision analysis
 Deployment of intelligent transportation systems to manage congestion
 Road Emergency Services Communications Unit expansion
 Pedestrian crossing signals

Sections 
Transportation Services is divided into seven sections: 
 Policy & Innovation
 Planning & Capital Programs
 Project Design & Management
 Business Performance
 Operations & Maintenance
 Traffic Management
 Permits & Enforcement

References

Transportation Services
City of Toronto departments